Prenzlauer Berg is a locality of Berlin, forming the southerly and most urban district of the borough of Pankow. From its founding in 1920 until 2001, Prenzlauer Berg was a district of Berlin in its own right. However, that year it was incorporated (along with the borough of Weißensee) into the greater district of Pankow.

From the 1960s onward, Prenzlauer Berg was associated with proponents of East Germany's diverse counterculture including Christian activists, bohemians, state-independent artists, and the gay community. It was an important site for the peaceful revolution that brought down the Berlin Wall in 1989. In the 1990s the borough was also home to a vibrant squatting scene. It has since experienced rapid gentrification.

Geography 
Prenzlauer Berg is a portion of the Pankow district in northeast Berlin. To the West and Southwest it borders Mitte, to the South Friedrichshain-Kreuzberg, to the East Lichtenberg, and to the North Weißensee and Pankow.

Geologically, the borough straddles the southernmost edge of the Barnim glacial deposit formed during the last Ice Age. Prenzlauer Berg (literally Prenzlau Hill) was always seen as a hill by the inhabitants of historic Berlin situated to the South in the glacial valley along the river Spree. Until the 20th century the area was mostly referred to as "Windmill Hill".

Today, the highest point of the district is 91 meters above sea level in the northwest of Volkspark Prenzlauer Berg. This hill consists of the rubble from the countless houses that were destroyed in World War II during allied air raids and by Soviet artillery in the Battle of Berlin.

Cityscape 
Prenzlauer Berg is characterized by Wilhelmine buildings, that were erected at the turn of the 20th century (1889 to 1905). Over 80% of all housing in this area was constructed before 1948, with the oldest building still standing being from 1848 at Kastanienallee 77. Though substantial, there was less war-related destruction here than in other parts of the city, which were almost entirely wiped out by the allied bombing campaign.

Apart from the apartment buildings in the area around Ostseestraße built in the 1950s, characterized by the architectural style of Socialist Classicism, the borough was mostly left alone by Socialist city planners until the 1980s when prestigious high rise buildings were built in Ernst-Thälmann-Park.

During German Reunification the borough's residential areas were characterized by dilapidated grey facades that had not seen a coat of paint since the 1930s. In the 1990s the buildings that belonged to state-owned housing associations were sold to private investors, who had them renovated and raised the rents. Most of the borough's original inhabitants could not afford the increased costs and have since moved away. In the 21st century the many empty lots that were sites for the street culture integral to the bohemian character of the borough were filled by high-class condominiums.

Today, Prenzlauer Berg forms a nearly homogeneous historic building area. Over 300 buildings remain protected as historic monuments, like the municipal swimming pool at Oderberger Straße and the breweries on Milastraße and Knaackstraße. The borough is famous for its restaurants and bars. Although places that provide a truly traditional Berlin staple are few and far between, there is a vast array of restaurants offering Arab, Turkish, Vietnamese, Tex-Mex, and Italian cuisine, especially around Kastanienalle, Kollwitzplatz, and Helmholtzplatz.
The nightlife concentrates around the U-Bahn station Eberswalder Straße. The area around the intersections of Schönhauser Allee, Danziger Straße, Eberswalder Straße, Kastanienallee and Pappelallee has been associated with youth culture since the 1950s and was immortalised in the DEFA film Ecke Schönhauser.

With regard to urban planning, the district affords a relatively uniform picture. It is predominantly characterized by five-story, multiple dwelling units in closed blocks. Thanks to the long property lots, the blocks, more often than not, are large and have abundant backyards, some having a perimeter of more than a kilometer.

Notable buildings are the large churches of the district, of which Gethsemane Church (designed by August Orth and built in 1891–1893) at Stargarder Straße is best known for its role in the peaceful revolution that brought down the Wall in 1989. Its 66-meter steeple is surpassed by that of Segenskirche on Schönhauser Allee (79 meters) and of Immanuelkirche on Prenzlauer Allee (68 meters). The representative school buildings, planned by Ludwig Ernst Emil Hoffmann (1852–1932), also stand out in the area.

The largest synagogue in Germany is that on Rykestraße. Construction began at the end of 1903 and it was dedicated on 4 September 1904. During the Third Reich the building escaped the antisemitic November pogrom in 1938, for the synagogue was tightly surrounded by residential buildings. The synagogue was desecrated and confiscated in April 1940. In July 1945, it reopened for services, underwent several renovations (1952/1953, 1976, 1987/1988) and on the occasion of its 100th anniversary it was restored to its original splendor. In the Jewish Cemetery on Schönhauser Allee, opened in 1827, there are more than 22,500 graves and 750 family tombs, including the graves of David Friedländer, Max Liebermann, Leopold Ullstein, Ludwig Bamberger, Eduard Lasker and Giacomo Meyerbeer.

A landmark in Prenzlauer Berg is the former water tower "Fat Hermann" at Rykestraße corner of Knaackstraße from the year 1877, which was the first water tower in Berlin. Another remarkable building is the Zeiss-Großplanetarium on Prenzlauer Allee, opened in 1987.

In the west, bordering the borough of Wedding, adjacent to Friedrich Ludwig Jahn Sportpark, is a stretch public green area that goes by the name of Mauerpark (Wall park). It consists of the former border zone, or "death strip" between both walls that separated East- and West Berlin. Before the war, the terrain was a site of a freight station. After reunification the area was turned into a public park, which is home to a weekly flea market and open air concerts. It attracts thousands of visitors on summer weekends.

History 
Prenzlauer Berg was developed during the second half of the 19th century based on an urban planning design from 1862 by James Hobrecht, the so-called Hobrecht-Plan for Berlin. Prenzlauer Berg was part of what became known as the Wilhelmine Ring with a primarily working-class population. Before the Second World War around 11% of Prenzlauer Berg's population were Jewish. In Nazi Germany (1933–1945) landmark buildings such as the water tower at Rykestraße and the office buildings at Froebelstraße were used as makeshift concentration camps and torture chambers.

During the war years the city population decreased as many inhabitants were evacuated to the countryside to escape aerial bombardment. When the city was divided by the allies, Prenzlauer Berg became part of the Soviet Sector and from 1947 onward part of the capital of the German Democratic Republic. From the 1960s onward, the borough's tenement houses (in German: Mietskasernen) were home to intellectuals, artists, students, and East Germany's gay community.

In the interim between the peaceful revolution that brought down the wall in 1989 and the consolidation of a united Germany that began a year later, as many as 39 Wilhelmine apartment houses were squatted in Prenzlauer Berg alone. Focal points were the areas around Kastanienallee, Teutoburger Platz and Helmholtzplatz (locally known as "LSD-Borough" for the initials of its three main thoroughfares Lychener- Schliemann- and Dunckerstraße).  The first ones to move in were young grassroots activists from Prenzlauer Berg in search of radical democratic alternatives to the state-socialism of the GDR. They were soon joined by young anarchists from West-Berlin and other parts of Germany and set up countless collective projects ranging from bicycle workshops to community soup kitchens. Some of the squats contributed to the cultural life of the borough as they were venues for concerts, poetry slams, and underground movie screenings. They frequently came under attack by neonazi skinheads. While many squats were cleared out by the police by 1998, some inhabitants entered into contracts with the city and were able to stay on.

Most of Prenzlauer Berg's urban apartment blocks had belonged to the state-owned housing associations of the GDR. After reunification they entered into a massive privatization scheme and were bought up by private investors who raised the rents. This has led to many original residents who were no longer able to afford the elevated living expenses being replaced by more affluent newcomers.

Historic buildings like Wasserturm (water tower), near Kollwitzplatz, or the Prater Beer Garden in Kastanienallee, as well as the former brewery in Schönhauser Allee/Sredzkystraße still give an impression of the days when Prenzlauer Berg was part of so-called Steinernes Berlin (Berlin of stone) as described by author Werner Hegemann in 1930.

Prenzlauer Berg today 

Countless pubs, restaurants, cafés, galleries and little shops create a day and nightlife atmosphere unique from the rest of Berlin. Along with Schöneberg, Neukölln and Mitte, Prenzlauer Berg is a focal point of the Berlin art scene. Along with Friedrichshain, Neukölln and Kreuzberg it is also a popular neighbourhood with the student population; however, in recent years, the gentrification that paralleled the borough's rise in popularity resulted in an exodus of students to cheaper neighborhoods. In 2007 German journalist Henning Sußebach coined the term Bionade-Biedermeier, a neologism combining the name of a popular organic softdrink with the Biedermeier era (1815–1848) to describe the sociocultural situation of Prenzlauer Berg. The term is equivalent to e.g. LOHAS and Bobo (Bohémiens bourgeois).

Prenzlauer Berg is visited by tourists for its nightlife and central location. Unlike other parts of Berlin, it retains much of its prewar architecture and is still replete with cobble-stoned streets and ornate buildings from the beginning of the 20th century. Many areas of Prenzlauer Berg have become trendy shopping areas with streetstyle fashion designers selling their wares in its boutiques.

Prenzlauer Berg is also one of the few places in Germany that have experienced a baby boom since the mid 1990s. This is due to the above-average presence of people between 20 and 40 rather than a higher birthrate than elsewhere in the country. The borough has adapted to the trend offering an abundance of playgrounds, daycare centers, as well as (second-hand) shops and cafes catering to the needs of young children and their parents.

Since the late 1990s Prenzlauer Berg has become popular for more affluent people from Southern Germany who have bought condominiums here. More recently, North American, British, Scandinavian, Australian and Spanish citizens have moved into the borough attracted by the relatively cheap cost of accommodation and studio space compared to other cultural capitals like New York, London, and Paris.

Over the years many artists chose Prenzlauer Berg as their residence: the painter and sculptor Käthe Kollwitz, the early film maker Max Skladanowsky, the poets Adolf Endler, Annemarie Bostroem, and Heinz Kahlau, the theater director Christoph Schlingensief, the writers Jurek Becker, Bruno Apitz, Peter Hacks, Herbert Nachbar, Dieter Noll, Klaus Schlesinger, Klaus Kordon, Uwe Kolbe, Paul Alfred Kleinert, Florian Illies, Wladimir Kaminer, and Detlef Opitz, the sculptor Olaf Nicolai, the painters Cornelia Schleime, Elke Pollack, and Konrad Knebel, the photographers Thomas Florschuetz, Helga Paris, and Nicolaus Schmidt, the film director Tom Tykwer, the keyboardist Jörn-Uwe Fahrenkrog-Petersen, the playwright René Pollesch, the musicians Gerhard Schöne, Christian Lillinger, Nina Hagen, Dirk von Lowtzow (Tocotronic) and Till Lindemann, (Rammstein), the actors Fredy Sieg, Eva-Maria Hagen, Heike Makatsch, Katharina Wackernagel, David Bennent, Daniel Brühl, August Diehl, Kurt Krömer and Matthias Schweighöfer, the comic-strip artist Flix, as well as the TV- and radio presenters Hans Rosenthal, Alfred Biolek, Sarah Kuttner, Sandra Maischberger and Benjamin Tewaag.

Points of interest 
 Gethsemane Church, former meeting place of the resistance in the GDR
 The area around Helmholtzplatz and along Kastanienallee for restaurants and bars
Kollwitzplatz on market days
 Jewish cemetery on Schönhauser Allee, where painter Max Liebermann and composer Giacomo Meyerbeer are buried
The former breweries Kulturbrauerei, Schultheiss, and "Pfefferberg."
 Mauerpark (flea market every Sunday, open air concerts during summer months)
 Rykestrasse Synagogue
 Wasserturm Prenzlauer Berg (water tower), designed by Henry Gill, constructed by the English Waterworks Company and finished in 1877.

People 

Kurt Demmler (1943–2009), songwriter; accused of sexual abuse he hanged himself in his jail cell.
 Heinz Kapelle (1913–1941), communist
 Ernst Knaack, (1914–1944), resistance fighter
 Christian Lorenz (born 1966), musician and keyboard player for band Rammstein
 Käthe Niederkirchner (1909–1944), resistance fighter
 Wilhelm Rietze (1903–1944), resistance fighter
 Hans Rosenthal (1925–1987),  radio editor, director, and one of the most popular German radio and television hosts of the 1970s and 1980s.
 Gustav Scholz (1930–2000), boxer
 Cornelia Schleime (born 1953), painter, performer, filmmaker and author
 Arthur Sodtke (1901–1944), resistance fighter
 Ernst Thälmann (1886–1944), communist politician
 Agnes Wendland (1891–1946), Righteous Among the Nations

References

External links 

 tic-berlin: tourist & historical information about Prenzlauer Berg
 Prenzlberger Stimme (News and opinions from Prenzlauer Berg in German)
 Prenzlauer Berg Nachrichten (the local blog in German)
 BBC article about the baby boom in Prenzlauer berg
 Herald Tribune Article about Berlin and Prenzlauer Berg
Historical interactive map of Berlin squats in German and English

Former boroughs of Berlin
Gentrification
Localities of Berlin
Entertainment districts in Germany